Nugegoda Sports and Welfare Club is a multi-faceted Sri Lankan club founded in 1870. It is based in the Colombo suburb of Athurugiriya which is just to the north of Nugegoda. It is best known for its first-class cricket team which was formed before the 2013–14 season when it took part in the second-class Donovan Andree Tournament. Ahead of the 2019–20 season, Nugegoda were elevated to first-class, List A and Twenty20 status. They played in Tier B of the Premier League Tournament, the Invitation Limited Overs Tournament and the SLC T20 Tournament.

The team played its inaugural first-class match on 31 January and 1 February 2020 against Kalutara Town Club at the Arons Cricket Club Ground in Horana. Nugegoda won the toss and decided to bat first. They made a bad start and were all out before lunch for 56 from just 23 overs. Kalutara Town responded with 160 and, commencing their second innings, Nugegoda reached 92/3 at close of play, still eleven runs behind. On the second day, Nugegoda soon cleared the deficit and were 137/5 when Pramud Hettiwatte was joined at the wicket by Jahangir Mirza. These two added 101 before Hettiwatte was out for 84. Asantha Basnayake then scored 52 from 43 balls to take the score up to 307, a lead of 203. Kalutara Town were all out for 84 in their second innings and so, despite their poor start, Nugegoda won by 119 runs. The season was cancelled in March due to the COVID-19 pandemic. Nugegoda were then seventh in the Tier B table, having won three of the seven matches they had played.

For their relaunch of domestic cricket in 2022, Sri Lanka Cricket (SLC) decided on a rebranding of the senior competitions. They replaced the Premier League Tournament with the Major League Tournament. They also introduced the SLC Major Clubs Limited Overs Tournament and the SLC Major Clubs T20 Tournament. As one of the 26 major clubs, Nugegoda was invited to take part in all three competitions. They were included in Group B of the first-class Major League Tournament. They finished 11th of the thirteen clubs with a record of one win, one defeat, nine draws and one no result from their twelve matches.

Notes

References

Sources
 

Sri Lankan first-class cricket teams